Luke Hall may refer to:

 Luke Hall (politician) (born 1986), British Conservative Member of Parliament
 Luke Hall (swimmer) (born 1989), Swazi swimmer
 Luke Edward Hall (born 1989), British designer